Evergreen Cemetery is a historic African American cemetery in Bartow, Florida. In 2014, the city commission passed a resolution to acquire the cemetery through eminent domain. No owner was reportedly known and the historic character and deteriorating condition of the cemetery were listed. A court order gave the city ownership of the cemetery in December 2014 and a cleanup and survey were planned. A cleanup of the cemetery is scheduled for November 21, 2020. It covers 4.6 acres. The cemetery is on the city's west side along busy State Road 60 and Baker Avenue.

Burials
 Benjamin F. Livingston a Reconstruction era legislator.
 Prince Johnson, one of Bartow's city founders
 Ossian Sweet and his father Henry W. Sweet
 George W. Bayley, father of Bartow mayor Charlie E. Bayley

References

External links 
 

Cemeteries in Florida
African-American cemeteries in Florida
African-American history of Florida
Bartow, Florida